Walnut Bend is a subdivision in Houston, Texas, United States.

Walnut Bend is located north of Westheimer Road (Farm to Market Road 1093) and outside Beltway 8. It is near Westchase.

Ten sections opened in the late 1950s.

History
After Hurricane Katrina struck New Orleans in 2005, many refugees from the hurricane settled in apartment complexes in close proximity to Walnut Bend. Friction appeared between Walnut Bend homeowners and Katrina refugees.

Government and infrastructure
Walnut Bend is a part of Houston City Council District G.

Education

Walnut Bend residents are zoned to Houston Independent School District schools. The community is within Trustee District VI, represented by Greg Meyers as of 2008.

Schools serving Walnut Bend include Walnut Bend Elementary School, located in Walnut Bend section six; Revere Middle School; (with West Briar Middle School as an option), and Westside High School. Residents zoned to Westside may transfer to Lamar High School.

Walnut Bend Elementary first opened in 1964 with a capacity of 350 students. It received a new campus building in 2007. Its current two-story $14 million campus was designed by VLK Architects and constructed by Heery International.

Revere opened in 1980 and Westside opened in 2000. Prior to the opening of Westside, Walnut Bend was zoned to Lee High School (now Wisdom High School). Prior to the opening of Revere Middle School, Walnut Bend was zoned to TH Rogers Junior High.

Residents zoned to Ashford, Askew, Bush, Daily, Emerson, and Walnut Bend may attend Shadowbriar Elementary School's magnet program.

See also

References

External links
 Walnut Bend Home Association
 Walnut Bend Independent News

Neighborhoods in Houston